Escalls is a hamlet in the civil parish of Sennen on the Penwith peninsula in west Cornwall, England, UK.

Toponyny
Escalls  previously written as Heskels (in 1280 and 1481), Eskeles (1281) and Eskels (1296); possibly hesk als meaning sedge cliff in the Cornish language.

Geography
To the south of the hamlet of Escalls is Escalls Green, to the north is Escalls Moor and west of the moor is Escalls Cliff and Whitesand Bay. The South West Coast Path follows the coast of Whitesand Bay crossing Escalls Cliff. Most of the houses are now holiday homes or let to visitors.

Escalls Methodist Chapel was formerly a Bible Christian chapel and is on the nearby A30 road.

History
Escalls Cross is a roughly-hewn granite cross with a damaged wheel head, probably dating to before 1066. It was formerly at Escalls Farm and is now in nearby Sunny Corner Lane.

In the Middle Ages Escalls was owned by the Penros family. The best-known member of the family, John Penros (died 1411) was Lord Chief Justice of Ireland in 1385–86, despite being a notorious felon. His litany of  serious crimes, including treason,  piracy and murder  (technically he was only an  accessory  to  the murder)  ultimately led to his downfall, although his descendants remained at Escalls for some generations. 

At the time of the English Civil War there were a number of families who were members of the Society of Friends (Quakers), and there is a Quaker burial ground at the parish boundary with St Just. One family that was active with the Quakers was the Vyngow's, now spelt Vingoe. Digory Vingoe owned land in the parish and bought land at Escalls in 1655 from Sir John Arundel. By 1838 there are about twenty landowners listed on the Sennen Tithe Apportionment Map with land at Escalls. Those with the most land were Richard Botheras, John Humphreys, John Vincoe, William Vingoe and Sir John St Aubyn. Most of the land was described as arable.

References

External links

Hamlets in Cornwall
Quakerism in England
Sennen